Martin Hudec (born 27 June 1980) is a Czech rally driver. He is racing in the WRC-2 since the 2013 season.

Career results

WRC results

* Season still in progress.

WRC 2 results

* Season still in progress.

Czech Rally Championship results

* Season still in progress.

External links 
 eWRC-results.com profile

1980 births
Place of birth missing (living people)
Czech rally drivers
Living people
World Rally Championship drivers